Mikaël Roche (born 24 December 1982) is a footballer from Papeete, Tahiti, who plays as a goalkeeper for A.S. Central Sport. He is a member of the Tahiti national football team.

Career
Roche started his career with local club AS Jeunes before moving to France to play for AS Monaco reserve team in 2000. He moved to ROS Menton in the following year, staying with the team until 2005, later transferring to US Marseille Endoume.

Roche returned to Tahiti in 2006 to his former club AS Jeunes, joining AS Dragon in 2009 and winning the Tahiti First Division in 2011–12. Roche is also a PE teacher. He has stated this in an interview.

International career
Roche made his debut for the Tahiti in 2011 and was the starting goalkeeper at 2012 OFC Nations Cup before losing his starting place to Xavier Samin after the first two matches, as the team won the competition for the first time. On 20 June 2013, he conceded ten goals against Spain in the 2013 FIFA Confederations Cup, he however was considered a hero during this match and won the support of the Brazilian fans.  He also traded shirts with his counterpart, Pepe Reina after the match.

Honours

Domestic
Tahiti First Division:
 Winner (1): 2012

International
OFC Nations Cup:
 Winner (1): 2012

International career statistics

References

External links

1982 births
Living people
French Polynesian footballers
French Polynesian expatriate footballers
Tahiti international footballers
AS Monaco FC players
US Marseille Endoume players
Rapid de Menton players
2012 OFC Nations Cup players
2013 FIFA Confederations Cup players
2016 OFC Nations Cup players
People from Papeete
Association football goalkeepers